François Jacques Florentin Lafortune (10 January 1896 – ?) was a Belgian rifle shooter who competed at five Olympic Games (1924, 1936, 1948, 1952, 1960). He was born in Leuven.

He was part of a shooting family with sixteen Olympic appearances between them. His last two Olympic appearances were made with his son, seven-time-Olympian Frans Lafortune. His last Olympic appearance was also made with his younger brother, four-time Olympian Marcel Lafortune.

His older brother Hubert Lafortune was part of the Belgian gymnastics team that won silver at the 1920 Olympic Games.

References

1896 births
Year of death missing
Belgian male sport shooters
ISSF rifle shooters
Olympic shooters of Belgium
Shooters at the 1924 Summer Olympics
Shooters at the 1936 Summer Olympics
Shooters at the 1948 Summer Olympics
Shooters at the 1952 Summer Olympics
Shooters at the 1960 Summer Olympics
Sportspeople from Leuven